David Parker Ray (November 6, 1939 – May 28, 2002), also known as the Toy-Box Killer, was an American kidnapper, torturer, serial rapist and suspected serial killer. Though no bodies were found, Ray was accused by his accomplices of killing several women, and was suspected by the police to have murdered as many as sixty women from Arizona and New Mexico while living in Elephant Butte, New Mexico, approximately seven miles north of Truth or Consequences.

Ray used soundproofing methods on a semi-trailer, which he called his "toy box", and equipped it with items used for sexual torture. He would kidnap between five and six women a year, holding each of them captive for around three to four months. During this period he would sexually abuse his victims, sometimes involving his dog or his wife (who participated willingly in her husband's crimes), and often torture them with surgical instruments. Then Ray would drug them with barbiturates in an attempt to erase their memories of what had happened before abandoning them by the side of the road.

Ray was convicted of kidnapping and torture in 2001, for which he received a lengthy sentence, but he was never convicted of murder. He died of a heart attack about one year after his convictions in two cases (the second of which resulted in a plea deal).

Biography
During his childhood, David Parker Ray and his younger sister, Peggy, lived with their disciplinarian grandfather. He was sporadically visited by his violent, alcoholic father, who would supply him with magazines depicting sadomasochistic pornography. At Mountainair High School, in Mountainair, New Mexico, he was bullied by his peers for his shyness around girls.

Ray's sexual fantasies of raping, torturing, and even murdering women developed during his teenage years. Around this time, his sister discovered his sadomasochistic drawings, as well as pornographic photographs of bondage acts. After completing high school, Ray received an honorable discharge from the United States Army, where his service included work as a general mechanic.

Ray was divorced four times and had two children, including his accomplice, daughter Jesse Ray (born Glenda Jean Ray).

Crimes
Ray sexually tortured and presumably killed his victims using whips, chains, pulleys, straps, clamps, leg spreader bars, surgical blades, electric shock machines, and saws. It is thought that he terrorized many women with these tools for many years with the help of accomplices, some of whom are alleged to have been several of the women he was dating. Inside the torture room, along with numerous sex toys, torture implements, syringes, and detailed diagrams showing ways of inflicting pain, there was a homemade electrical generator, which was used for torture.

A mirror was mounted in the ceiling, above the obstetric table to which he strapped his victims. Ray also put his victims in wooden contraptions that bent them over and immobilized them while he had his dogs and sometimes other friends rape them. He has been said to have wanted his victims to see everything he was doing to them. Ray often had an audio tape recording of his voice played for his victims whenever they regained consciousness.

Arrest and investigation
Cynthia Vigil was abducted from an Albuquerque parking lot by Ray and his girlfriend, Cindy Hendy. She was taken to Elephant Butte, confined to the trailer and tortured. After three days of captivity, Vigil escaped from the trailer on March 22, 1999.

To escape, she waited until Ray had gone to work, and then unlocked her chains with keys that Hendy had left on a nearby table. Hendy noticed Vigil's attempt to escape and a fight ensued. During the struggle, Hendy broke a lamp on the captive's head, but Vigil unlocked her chains and stabbed Hendy in the neck with an icepick.

Vigil fled while wearing only an iron slave collar and padlocked chains. She ran down the road seeking help, which she got from a nearby homeowner who took her in, comforted her, and called the police. Her escape led officials to the trailer and instigated the capture of Ray and his accomplices. Police detained Ray and Hendy.

Another victim, Angelica Montano, came forward with a similar story to that of Vigil. She said she had been held captive by Ray after Hendy invited her to the house to pick up a cake mix. After being raped and tortured, Montano convinced the pair to release her along the highway. She was picked up by an off-duty law enforcement officer and told him what happened, but he did not believe her and left her at a bus stop. She also later called police about the incident, but there had been no follow-up.

Police identified another victim, Kelli Garrett (also called Kelli Van Cleave), from a videotape which dated from 1996.

Garrett was found alive in Colorado after police identified her from a tattoo on her ankle. She testified that she had gotten in a fight with her husband and decided to spend the night playing pool with friends. Ray's daughter, Jesse, who knew Garrett, took her to the Blu-Water Saloon in Truth Or Consequences, New Mexico, and may have drugged the beer she was drinking. She offered Garrett a ride home but instead took Garrett to her father’s house.

Garrett said she endured two days of torture before Ray drove her back to her home. Ray told her husband that he had found the woman incoherent on a beach. Her husband did not believe that she could not remember where she had been and Garrett said she did not know what to tell police and so did not contact them. Her husband sued for divorce and Garrett moved to Colorado. She was later interviewed on Cold Case Files about her ordeal.

The Federal Bureau of Investigation sent 100 agents to examine Ray's property and surroundings, but no identifiable human remains were found.

To prevent women from reporting the assaults, Ray drugged them in an attempt to induce amnesia. He made a tape recording of himself telling one woman that the drugs were "sodium pentothal and phenobarbital [sic]".

While awaiting trial, Ray spoke to FBI profilers and said that he was fascinated by the kidnapping of Colleen Stan and other sexually motivated kidnappings. The FBI had spoken to Ray as early as 1989 in connection with his business manufacturing and selling bondage-related sexual devices.

Trials and aftermath 
A judge ruled that the cases for crimes against Cynthia Vigil, Angelica Montano, and Kelli Garrett would be severed, meaning that Ray would be tried for each separately. Prosecutors said this damaged their case as each woman's story would otherwise have corroborated and bolstered the others' accounts. The judge also ruled much of the evidence found in the trailer during the 1999 raid could not be admitted in the Garrett or Montano cases. The first trial, for crimes against Kelli Garrett, resulted in a mistrial after two jurors said they found her story unbelievable. Ray’s defense was that the sex trailer was part of Ray’s fantasy life and any sex was consensual. After a retrial, Ray was convicted on all 12 counts.

A week into his trial for crimes against Vigil, Ray agreed to a plea bargain and was sentenced in 2001 to 224 years in prison for numerous offenses in the abduction and sexual torture of three young women at his Elephant Butte  home. The plea deal was to obtain leniency for his daughter. Prosecutors stated that the surviving victims had approved of the deal.

Ray's daughter, Glenda Jean "Jesse" Ray, was charged with kidnapping and criminal sexual penetration. She pled no contest and received a 30-month sentence with an additional five years to be served on probation.

In 1999, Dennis Roy Yancy (then aged 27) pleaded guilty to the 1997 murder of 22-year-old Marie Parker in Elephant Butte. Yancy confessed to helping Jesse Ray lure Parker into captivity in her father’s trailer. Yancy said that Parker was tortured and that Ray forced him to strangle the woman to death. Parker's body was never found; prosecutors noted that no forensic evidence was found to tie Parker to the Rays.  

Yancy was also charged with kidnapping, two counts of conspiracy to commit a crime, and tampering with evidence. He was sentenced to 30 years. The Rays were not charged in Parker’s murder. In 2010, Yancy was paroled after serving 11 years in prison, but the release was delayed by difficulties in negotiating a plan for residence. Three months after his release in 2011, Yancy was charged with violating his parole. He was remanded to custody, where he remained until 2021, serving the rest of his original sentence.

In 2000, Cindy Hendy, an accomplice who testified against Ray, received a sentence of 36 years for her role in the crimes. She was scheduled to receive parole in 2017. She was released on July 15, 2019, after serving the two years of her parole in prison.

On May 28, 2002, Ray was taken to the Lea County Correctional Facility, in Hobbs, New Mexico, to be questioned by state police. He died of a heart attack before the interrogation took place.

Cynthia Vigil later founded Street Safe New Mexico, a volunteer harm reduction nonprofit that works with sex workers and other vulnerable people living on the street, with Christine Barber.

References

External links

Transcripts of David Parker Ray's audiotapes to his victims
Videotape shown in David Parker Ray retrial Associated Press
The Toy Box Killer Criminal Minds
Famous Serial Killer Profiles  Roy Whyte
The Toy Box (Part 1, Part 2, Part 3) - Casefile True Crime Podcast
True Consequences interview with Cynthia Vigil Jaramillo (Episode 5) 

1939 births
2002 deaths
20th-century American criminals
American kidnappers
American male criminals
American people convicted of torture
American people who died in prison custody
American rapists
American Satanists
Filmed killings
People from Belen, New Mexico
People from Sierra County, New Mexico
Prisoners who died in New Mexico detention
Suspected serial killers
Torture in the United States
Violence against women in the United States